Conostethus is a genus of true bugs belonging to the family Miridae.

The genus was first described by Fieber in 1858.

Species:
 Conostethus angustus
 Conostethus brevis
 Conostethus griseus
 Conostethus hungaricus
 Conostethus major
 Conostethus roseus
 Conostethus venustus

References

Miridae